David Gällring is a Swedish songwriter, producer, and designer from Växjö, Sweden. He studied music production at the Linnaeus University. After graduation, he started his own company Mood Swing Studio, enabling him to work with artists, bands, labels, and songwriters in various projects and genres. In 2014, Gällring and Karl Sahlin formed the EDM duo NiERO, having independently released "Reach for the Stars", which had a wide reach on Spotify, and another two singles via the British label We Are Intelligence. Shortly after, they decided to act as a songwriting duo instead.

Discography

NiERO

Singles 
 2014: "Captain"
 2015: "Reach For The Stars" (Feat. Emma Olsson)
 2015: "Supercell"
 2015: "Runaways"

Production/Songwriting

Entries in Eurovision Song Contest Pre-Selections

Songwriting Credits

References 

Swedish songwriters
Living people
People from Karlskrona
Year of birth missing (living people)